Papilio himeros is a species of butterfly in the family Papilionidae. It is found in Argentina and Brazil.

Description
Both wings with yellow band (which is broader in the male than in the female); tail with yellow apical spot; submarginal spots of the hindwing in the male yellow, in the female red except the 2 anterior ones.

Similar species
Papilio lamarchei

Biogeographic realm
Neotropical realm

References

External links
Butterfly corner Images from Naturhistorisches Museum Wien

himeros
Papilionidae of South America
Taxa named by Carl Heinrich Hopffer
Taxonomy articles created by Polbot
Butterflies described in 1866